Caryocolum blandelloides is a moth of the family Gelechiidae. It is found in Great Britain, Spain, Germany, Austria, Switzerland, Italy, Denmark, Scandinavia, Czech Republic, Slovakia, Estonia, Poland, Ukraine, Russia and Greece, as well as on Corsica, Sardinia and Crete.

The length of the forewings is 4.5–6 mm for males and 4-5.5 mm for females. The forewings are whitish, flecked with orange-brown and grey. The forewings are dark brown along the costa and at the apex. Adults have been recorded on wing from late July to early August.

The larvae feed on Cerastium arvense strictum and possibly Cerastium semidecandrum. They feed within the flowers. Larvae can be found in mid-June. Pupation takes place on the ground.

References

Moths described in 1981
blandelloides
Moths of Europe